Maria of Antioch-Armenia (1215–1257) was lady of Toron from 1229 to her death.  She was the elder daughter of Raymond-Roupen, prince of Antioch, and of Helvis of Lusignan. She derived her title of Lady of Toron and claim to the throne of Armenia from her father.

Maria's paternal grandmother Alice became lady of Toron when emperor Frederick II, at the end of the Sixth Crusade, negotiated the return of lands conquered by Saladin; Maria succeeded her as she was the closest surviving relative.

In 1240 she married Philip of Montfort, Lord of Tyre, previously lord of Castres, and they had the following children:

Jean de Montfort (died 1283), lord of Toron and of Tyre
Humphrey of Montfort (died 1284), lord of Beirut and of Tyre
Alix, living in 1282 and in 1295
Helvis, living in 1282 and in 1295

She was the great-granddaughter of Roupen III, prince of Armenia (Roupen III's daughter was Alice), who had been succeeded by his brother Leo I.  Maria thus unsuccessfully claimed rights to the throne of Armenia, something her father and grandmother had previously attempted and failed.

Sources
This page is a translation of :fr:Marie d'Antioche (1215-).
 
 http://generoyer.free.fr/H-PhilippedeMONTFORT.htm

1215 births
1257 deaths
Christians of the Sixth Crusade
Lords of Toron
Armenian princesses
House of Montfort
13th-century women rulers